Fiji competed at the 2018 Commonwealth Games in the Gold Coast, Australia from April 4 to April 15, 2018. It was Fiji's 16th appearance at the Commonwealth Games.

Fiji competed in 12 sports and made their first appearance in the Men’s rugby sevens tournament after a twelve year absence. Fiji announced a team of 97 athletes. Though only 96 competed.

Weightlifter Apolonia Vaivai was the country's flag bearer during the opening ceremony.

Medalists

Competitors
The following is the list of number of competitors participating at the Games per sport/discipline.

Athletics

Fiji participated with 12 athletes (8 men and 4 women).

Men
Track & road events

Field events

Women
Track & road events

Field events

Badminton

Fiji participated with six athletes (2 men and 4 women).

Singles

Doubles

Beach volleyball

Fiji qualified a men's and women's beach volleyball team for a total of four athletes.

Boxing

Fiji participated with two athletes (2 men).

Men

Lawn bowls

Fiji will compete in Lawn bowls.

Men

Women

Netball

Fiji qualified a netball team by virtue of being ranked in the top 11 (excluding the host nation, Australia) of the INF World Rankings on July 1, 2017.

Roster

Nina Cirikisuva
Episake Gaunavinaka
Alisi Naqiri
Merelita Radininaceva
Lusiani Rokoura
Maliana Rusivakula
Unouna Rusivakula
Verenaisi Sawana
Aliso Wainidroa
Alesi Waqa
Laisani Waqa
Alanieta Waqainabete

Pool A

Eleventh place match

Rugby sevens

Men's tournament

Fiji qualified a men's team of 12 athletes by being among the top nine ranked nations from the Commonwealth in the 2016–17 World Rugby Sevens Series ranking. Samisoni Viriviri was added to replace the injured Semi Kunatani.

Roster

Paula Dranisinukula
Semi Kunatani
Mesulame Kunavula
Sevuloni Mocenecagi
Alasio Naduva
Amenoni Nasilasila
Kalione Nasoko
Vatemo Ravouvou
Eroni Sau
Jerry Tuwai
Ratu Vakurinabili
Jasa Veremalua
Samisoni Viriviri

Pool D

Semi-finals

Gold medal match

Women's tournament

Roster

Lavena Cavuru
Rusila Nagasau
Ana Naimasi
Miriama Naiobasali
Litia Naiqato
Timaima Ravisa
Viniana Riwai
Ana Roqica
Pricilla Siata
Vasiti Solikoviti
Lavenia Tinai
Luisa Tisolo

Pool B

Lower classification round

Match for fifth place

Shooting

Fiji participated with four athletes (4 men).

Men

Squash

Fiji participated with four athletes (3 men and 1 woman).

Individual

Doubles

Swimming

Fiji participated with five athletes (3 men and 2 women).

Men

Women

Table tennis

Fiji participated with five athletes (2 men and 3 women).

Singles

Doubles

Team

Weightlifting

Fiji qualified seven weightlifters (three men and four women).

Men

Women

See also
Fiji at the 2018 Summer Youth Olympics

References

Nations at the 2018 Commonwealth Games
Fiji at the Commonwealth Games
2018 in Fijian sport